Shahi Tukra is type of bread pudding which originated in South Asia during the Mughal era in the 1600s. The literal translation of Shahi Tukra is royal piece or bite. Shahi tukre originated in the Mughal Empire when Indian chefs made this dish to present to royal Mughal courts. The white bread is fried in oil/ghee after which milk and sugar is added. The dish is flavored using saffron, cloves, and cardamom.

History 
DNA India reported the dish to be of Mughal origin and likely invented in Hyderabad.

The Shahi Tukra was a popular desert item of Mughal emperors who are reported to have consumed it during the holy month of Ramadan. It remains a popular item on Eid-ul-Fitr celebrating the end of Ramadan in South Asia.

See also
 Mughlai cuisine
 Double ka Meetha-a similar dish, also originating from Hyderabad, India using a different type of bread.

References

External links

Pakistani desserts
Hyderabadi cuisine
Mughlai cuisine
Muhajir cuisine
Milk dishes
Bread puddings
Dried fruit